The Spanish Architecture Award is a prize which has been given biannually by the Consejo Superior de los Colegios de Arquitectos de España (CSCAE) since 1993.

It was created to publicize the quality of architectural works in Spain. It is granted to the finished work that is considered worthy of recognition for its architectural singularity, its innovative contribution, and its paradigmatic construction quality. The winner is chosen by a jury comprising the head of the CSCAE, government ministers, and prominent architects.

Winning works

References

External links

  

1993 establishments in Spain
Architecture awards
Awards established in 1993
Spanish awards